Stephen J Smith is Meritorious Investigator at the Allen Institute for Brain Science [1] and Emeritus Professor of Molecular and Cellular Physiology at Stanford University [2]. He held faculty and Howard Hughes Medical Institute positions at the Yale University School of Medicine 1980-1989. He served 1990-2014 as a Stanford Professor, teaching many courses in synaptic physiology and cellular microscopy while mentoring many students and fellows [3]. He also taught in many expert workshops and summer courses at the Woods Hole Marine Biological Laboratory and the Cold Spring Harbor Laboratory.

Education
Smith earned a 1970 Reed College B.A. and a 1977 Ph.D. from the University of Washington, mentored there by Profs. Charles F. Stevens and Wolfhard Almers. Smith was a Miller Research Fellow 1977-1980 at the University of California Berkeley with Robert S. Zucker.

Research
Prof. Smith's 147 neuroscience and cell biology research publications to date are documented on his Stanford faculty profile page [2]. Some publications that have generated particularly wide and sustained attention are highlighted here, along with citation histories and perspectives from other authors.

Smith's doctoral, fellowship and early faculty research pioneered the exploration of neuronal calcium dynamics. He developed an innovative theory for activity-dependent intracellular calcium dynamics then solved hard tool-building problems to test that theory empirically [4].  The new tools were then used to make the first measurements of calcium dynamics in a vertebrate neuron [5] and the first spatial mapping of a presynaptic calcium signal [6]. Those same new tools empowered a 1985 collaborative discovery that activation of NMDA-type glutamate receptor-channels permits an influx calcium ions [7], a signal at the heart of many or most of today's synaptic plasticity models [7].

In the late 1980's, Smith's laboratory leveraged Roger Tsien's new fluo-3-AM dye to pioneer high-frame-rate video methods for imaging calcium dynamics. In 1990, his Yale laboratory published an article demonstrating that astrocytes were capable of a form of long-distance signaling which they called "calcium waves" and which transformed much thinking about neuroglial cell biology [8].

Smith's Stanford laboratory more recently adapted  William Betz' FM 1-43 dye innovation to make the first mammalian central nervous system measurements of presynaptic function at the single-synapse [9] and single-vesicle [10] levels. The group also invented a powerful histology method, called "array tomography" to enable pioneering explorations of presynaptic molecular architectures [11] at single-synapse and ultrastructural levels.

References
[1] Allen Institute Scientific Staff Profile: Stephen J Smith

[2] Stanford University Faculty Profile: Stephen J Smith

[3] Neurotree Profile: Stephen J Smith

[4] Smith SJ, Zucker RS (1980) Aequorin response facilitation and intracellular calcium accumulation in molluscan neurones. J Physiol 300:167-196.PubMed links to 50 articles citing to Smith and Zucker (1980)

[5] Smith SJ, MacDermott AB, Weight FF (1983) Detection of intracellular Ca2+ transients in sympathetic neurones using arsenazo III. Nature 304:350-352.A perspective on early neuronal calcium dynamics measurement progress:

McBurney RN, Neering IR (1985) The measurement of changes in intracellular free calcium during action potentials in mammalian neurones. Journal of Neuroscience Methods 1985, 13:65-76.

[6] Augustine GJ, Charlton MP, Smith SJ (1985) Calcium entry into voltage-clamped presynaptic terminals of squid. J Physiol 367:143-162.

[7] MacDermott AB, Mayer ML, Westbrook GL, Smith SJ, Barker JL (1986) NMDA-receptor activation increases cytoplasmic calcium concentration in cultured spinal cord neurones. Nature 321:519-522.PubMed links to 301 articles citing MacDermott, et al. (1986)

Perspectives on the discovery of NMDA calcium fluxes and synaptic plasticity:

Malenka RC, Bear MF (2004) LTP and LTD: an embarrassment of riches. Neuron 44:5-21.

Kennedy MB (2013) Synaptic Signaling in Learning and Memory. Cold Spring Harb Perspect Biol 8:a016824.

Volianskis A, France G, Jensen MS, Bortolotto ZA, Jane DE, Collingridge GL (2015) Long-term potentiation and the role of N-methyl-D-aspartate receptors. Brain Res 1621:5-16.

Lodge D, Watkins JC, Bortolotto ZA, Jane DE, Volianskis A (2019) The 1980s: D-AP5, LTP and a Decade of NMDA Receptor Discoveries. Neurochem Res 44:516-530.[8] Cornell-Bell AH, Finkbeiner SM, Cooper MS, Smith SJ: Glutamate induces calcium waves in cultured astrocytes: long-range glial signaling. Science 1990, 247:470-473.PubMed links to 463 articles citing Cornell-Bell, et al. (1990)

Perspectives on the discovery of astrocytic calcium waves:

Haydon PG (2001) GLIA: listening and talking to the synapse. Nat Rev Neurosci 2:185-193.

Fields RD (2004) The other half of the brain. Sci Am 290:54-61.

Cotrina ML, Nedergaard M (2004) Intracellular Calcium Control Mechanisms in Glia. In Neuroglia. Edited by Kettenmann H, Ransom BR pp. 229-239. 

Bazargani N, Attwell D (2016) Astrocyte calcium signaling: the third wave. Nat Neurosci 19:182-189.

Jon Hamilton, " Einstein's Brain Unlocks Some Mysteries of The Mind",  NPR Morning Edition, 2 June 2010[9] Ryan TA, Reuter H, Wendland B, Schweizer FE, Tsien RW, Smith SJ (1993) The kinetics of synaptic vesicle recycling measured at single presynaptic boutons. Neuron 11:713-724.PubMed links to 187 articles citing Ryan, et al. (1993)

Perspective:

Murthy VN, Sejnowski TJ, Stevens CF (1997) Heterogeneous Release Properties of Visualized Individual Hippocampal Synapses. Neuron 18:599-612.[10] 22. Ryan TA, Reuter H, Smith SJ (1997) Optical detection of a quantal presynaptic membrane turnover. Nature 1997 388:478-482.PubMed links to 69 articles cited by Ryan, Reuter and Smith (1997)

Perspective:

Kavalali ET, Jorgensen EM (2014) Visualizing presynaptic function. Nat Neurosci 17:10-16.[11] Micheva KD, Smith SJ (2007) Array tomography: a new tool for imaging the molecular architecture and ultrastructure of neural circuits. Neuron 55:25-36.PubMed links to 332 articles citing Micheva and Smith (2007)

Perspectives:

Koike T, Yamada H (2019) Methods for array tomography with correlative light and electron microscopy. Med Mol Morphol 52:8-14.

Wacker I, Schroeder RR (2013) Array tomography. J Microsc 252:93-99.

Amy Standen, "Touring Memory Lane Inside the Brain", NPR KQED-QUEST, November 18, 2010

External links
 Allen Institute Scientific Staff Profile: Stephen J Smith
 Stanford University Faculty Profile: Stephen J Smith
 Neurotree Profile: Stephen J Smith

Living people
Year of birth missing (living people)
Stanford University School of Medicine faculty
University of Washington alumni
Yale University faculty
University of California, Berkeley people